Rickey  may refer to:

Surname or given name
 Anna S. Rickey (1827–1858), American poet
 Branch Rickey (1881–1965), Major League Baseball executive 
 Branch Rickey Jr. (1913–1961), son of Branch, also a Major League Baseball executive 
 Branch Barrett Rickey, also known as Branch Rickey III (born c. 1947), son of Branch Jr., current president of the Pacific Coast League
 George Rickey (1907–2002), American kinetic sculptor
 V. Frederick Rickey (born 1941), American mathematician and historian of mathematics
 Rickey Hatley (born 1994), American football player
 Rickey Henderson (born 1958), former Major League Baseball outfielder who is baseball's all-time leader in stolen bases and runs scored
 Rickey Medlocke, lead guitarist of Blackfoot and Lynyrd Skynyrd

Other uses
Rickey (cocktail), a family of cocktails

See also

 Ricky (disambiguation)